The Queen Elizabeth II Cup is a Group One Thoroughbred horse race at Sha Tin Racecourse in the New Territories, Hong Kong. Established in 1975 by the Royal Hong Kong Jockey Club, it is run annually in April at a distance of 2,000 metres (ten furlongs) on turf. Prior to 1997 it was run at 2,200 metres (eleven furlongs). Sponsored by Swiss watchmaker Audemars Piguet since 1999, it currently offers a purse of HK$20 million (US$2.6 million)since 2014/15.

The Queen Elizabeth II Cup was first run at the Happy Valley Racecourse in Happy Valley, Hong Kong to commemorate a visit to Hong Kong by Queen Elizabeth II and Prince Philip, Duke of Edinburgh. It was a local Class 1 or 2 race over a distance between 1,400 and 1,800 metres until 1995 when it opened to international entries. Since then, Hong Kong horses have been competing against those from the United Arab Emirates, the United Kingdom, France, Japan and Australia.

Since becoming a Group One race in 2001, every winner of the Audemars Piguet Queen Elizabeth II Cup has been a descendant of Northern Dancer. The 2006 race saw Irridescence upset the great filly and European Horse of the Year, Ouija Board.

The Queen Elizabeth II Cup has been sponsored by the Swiss haute horlogerie brand Audemars Piguet for around 17 years now, they continue to make special edition pieces (mostly based on the Royal Oak) to celebrate their sponsorship of the event. They join companies such as Omega SA, Rolex and Longines as one of the official sports event partners that provide both sponsorship and race timers.

Due to the COVID-19 outbreak, no overseas horses entered the race in 2020 and this international Group 1 event became a local race.

Winners since 1995

Earlier winners

See also
 List of Hong Kong horse races

References
Racing Post:

 The Hong Kong Jockey Club
 Hong Kong Jockey Club, Racing Information of Audemars Piguet QE II Cup  (2011/12)
 Goldolphin Racing, Queen Elizabeth II Cup

Horse races in Hong Kong
Open middle distance horse races
1975 establishments in Hong Kong
Recurring sporting events established in 1975